Robert Howard (November 26, 1975 in Brooklyn, New York – August 14, 2004 in Little Rock, Arkansas) was an American world-class triple and long jumper and a nine-time NCAA collegiate champion.

High school
Howard graduated from Shea High School in Pawtucket, Rhode Island in 1994.  His top triple jump while competing in the high school ranks was 51-5.75 (15.69m).  He received the Tom Doherty Memorial Award as the state's male athlete of the year.

Collegiate career
In choosing a college, Howard elected to follow in the lengthy horizontal jumping tradition at the University of Arkansas, where he would follow in the footsteps of such luminary jumpers as Mike Conley, Sr., Edrick Floreal, Jérôme Romain, Brian Wellman and Erick Walder.

Putting his own stamp on the track program, Howard won nine individual collegiate championships while jumping for Arkansas:

During this time, the Razorback team, under the guidance of legendary coach John McDonnell, itself won seven of the eight available NCAA team titles, indoors and out.

Howard competed at the 1997 World University Games, finishing third in the triple jump.  In 1997, he was named Collegiate Athlete of the Year by Track and Field News magazine for winning all four jumps in the two NCAA championship competitions.

All of Howard's personal records were set while he was a collegian:

Howard graduated from the university in 1998 with a bachelor's degree in pre-medicine/microbiology.

Professional career
In 1999, Howard missed the majority of the season with an injury.

Howard qualified for the US Olympic team in the triple jump twice, making the finals in both Atlanta and Sydney.  He finished seventh in 1996 and eighth in 2000.  He won the triple jump competition at the 2000 Olympic Trials with a leap of 55-9 (16.99).  His best finish in USATF competitions was a second in the triple jump in 2001.

Admitted to medical school in 1999, Howard worked in his jumping around his schooling, studying at the University of Arkansas for Medical Sciences to be a neurosurgeon.  He had deferred his medical studies for one year to train for the 2000 Olympics and again for the 2004 Olympics.  He finished fifth in the 2004 Olympic Trials, falling short in his attempt to make the Olympic team for the third time.

Rankings
During his career, Howard was ranked among the top jumpers in the US by Track and Field News.

Death
On August 14, 2004, shortly after his failure to make the Olympic team and in the opening hours of the 2004 Summer Olympics in Athens, Howard violently murdered his wife, Robin Mitchell, the chief neurosurgery resident at UAMS, and later leapt to his death from the 10th story of a medical school dormitory.  Police found Mitchell dead in the couple's bed with dozens of stab wounds to the head and torso.

References

External links
 Robert Howard at USATF
 
 
 
 2004 Olympic Trial results
 Razorback Track & Field Media Guide

1975 births
2004 suicides
American male long jumpers
American murderers
American male triple jumpers
Arkansas Razorbacks men's track and field athletes
Athletes (track and field) at the 1996 Summer Olympics
Athletes (track and field) at the 2000 Summer Olympics
Olympic track and field athletes of the United States
Universiade medalists in athletics (track and field)
Sportspeople from Brooklyn
Sportspeople from Little Rock, Arkansas
Sportspeople from Pawtucket, Rhode Island
Suicides by jumping in the United States
Suicides in Arkansas
Murder–suicides in the United States
Track and field athletes from New York City
Track and field athletes from Rhode Island
Universiade bronze medalists for the United States
Medalists at the 1997 Summer Universiade
Uxoricides